Paremonia luteicincta is a moth of the subfamily Arctiinae. It was described by William Jacob Holland in 1893. It is found in Gabon.

References

Endemic fauna of Gabon
Lithosiini
Moths described in 1893